Albæk is a Danish surname. Notable people with the surname include:

Mads Albæk (born 1990), Danish footballer
Morten Albæk (born 1975), Danish sophist, author, business person, and public speaker

See also
Ålbæk

Danish-language surnames